Jacobsburg is an unincorporated community in southeastern Smith Township, Belmont County, Ohio, United States.  It has a post office with the ZIP code 43933.  It lies along State Route 147.

Jacobsburg is part of the Wheeling, WV-OH Metropolitan Statistical Area.

History
Jacobsburg was laid out in 1815 by Jacob Calvert, and most likely was named for him. A post office called Jacobsburg has been in operation since 1824. Besides the post office, Jacobsburg had a tavern and two stores.

References

Unincorporated communities in Belmont County, Ohio
1815 establishments in Ohio
Populated places established in 1815
Unincorporated communities in Ohio